Henry George McGhee (3 July 1898 – 6 February 1959) was a British Labour Party politician.

He was educated in Lurgan, County Armagh and Glasgow and was a dentist. He was elected at the 1935 general election as Member of Parliament (MP) for Penistone in the West Riding of Yorkshire and held the seat until his death in 1959 aged 60.

During the late 1930s he was a member of the Parliamentary Pacifist Group.  In the late 1940s, he was treasurer of the Friends of Ireland.

His successor at the by-election following his death was John Mendelson.

He was the son of Irish MP, Richard McGhee.

References 

 Times Guide to the House of Commons October 1974

External links 

1898 births
1959 deaths
Labour Party (UK) MPs for English constituencies
UK MPs 1935–1945
UK MPs 1945–1950
UK MPs 1950–1951
UK MPs 1951–1955
UK MPs 1955–1959
Politics of Penistone